The 2019–20 Detroit Red Wings season was the 94th season for the National Hockey League (NHL) franchise that was established on September 25, 1926. It was the Red Wings' third season at Little Caesars Arena.

The Red Wings were eliminated from playoff contention on February 21, 2020 following a 4–1 loss to the New York Islanders, marking the Red Wings' fourth season in a row out of the playoffs. On March 10, the Red Wings clinched the worst overall record in the NHL for the first time since the 1985–86 season. The season was suspended by the league officials on March 12, 2020, after several other professional and collegiate sports organizations followed suit as a result of the ongoing COVID-19 pandemic. On May 26, the NHL regular season was officially declared over with the remaining games being cancelled and the Red Wings missed the playoffs for the fourth straight year. This was the first time since the 1985–86 season that the Red Wings finished with fewer than 20 wins. The Red Wings also became the first team since the 2004–05 NHL lockout, and the subsequent start of the salary cap era, to finish with a sub-.280 points percentage. Their .275 points percentage was the worst for an NHL team since the 1999–2000 Atlanta Thrashers.

Off-season
On April 19, 2019, Steve Yzerman was named executive vice president and general manager of the Red Wings. Ken Holland was retained by the organization and promoted to the team's senior vice president. On May 7, 2019, Holland was named the general manager and president of hockey operations of the Edmonton Oilers.

Standings

Divisional standings

Eastern Conference

Schedule and results

Preseason

Regular season

Player statistics

Skaters

Goaltenders

†Denotes player spent time with another team before joining the Red Wings. Stats reflect time with the Red Wings only.
‡Denotes player was traded mid-season. Stats reflect time with the Red Wings only.
Bold/italics denotes franchise record.

Awards and honours

Awards

Milestones

Transactions
The Red Wings have been involved in the following transactions during the 2019–20 season.

Trades

Notes:
  Detroit to retain 50% ($2.6875 million) of salary as part of trade.

Free agents

Retirement

Waivers

Draft picks

Below are the Detroit Red Wings' selections at the 2019 NHL Entry Draft, which was held on June 21 and 22, 2019, at Rogers Arena in Vancouver, British Columbia.

Notes:
 The New York Islanders' second-round pick went to the Detroit Red Wings as the result of a trade on February 26, 2018, that sent Tomas Tatar to Vegas in exchange for a first-round pick in 2018, a third-round pick in 2021 and this pick.
 The San Jose Sharks' second-round pick went to the Detroit Red Wings as the result of a trade on February 24, 2019, that sent Gustav Nyquist to San Jose in exchange for a conditional third-round pick in 2020 and this pick (being conditional at the time of the trade).
 The Toronto Maple Leafs' sixth-round pick went to the Detroit Red Wings as the result of a trade on June 22, 2019, that sent Columbus' fifth-round pick in 2019 (143rd overall) to Buffalo in exchange for a seventh-round pick in 2019 (191st overall) and this pick.
 The Buffalo Sabres' seventh-round pick went to the Detroit Red Wings as the result of a trade on June 22, 2019, that sent Columbus' fifth-round pick in 2019 (143rd overall) to Buffalo in exchange for Toronto's sixth-round pick in 2019 (177th overall) and this pick.

References

Detroit Red Wings
Detroit Red Wings
Detroit Red Wings
Detroit Red Wings seasons